Shein (styled as SHEIN) is a Chinese online fast fashion retailer headquartered in Singapore. Founded in Nanjing in October 2008 as ZZKKO by entrepreneur Chris Xu, Shein grew to become the world's largest fashion retailer as of 2022. Shein ships across 150+ countries, and was valued at $100 billion after a funding round in April 2022.

Known for selling relatively inexpensive apparel, Shein's success has been credited to its popularity among Generation Z consumers. The company was initially compared to that of a drop shipping business, as it was not involved in design and manufacturing, instead sourcing products from the wholesale clothing market in Guangzhou. Beginning in 2012, Shein began to establish its own supply chain system, transforming itself into a fully integrated retailer. The company has established its supply chain in Guangzhou with a network of more than 3,000 suppliers as of 2022.

In 2022, Shein generated US$24 billion in revenue, a total almost as large as established retailers Zara and H&M. In recent years, Shein has found itself in the middle of several controversies including trademark disputes, tax evasion, human rights violations, and health and safety concerns. According to Bloomberg Businessweek and others, Shein's business model has benefitted from the China–United States trade war.

History

2008—2012: Foundation and early business model 
Shein, originally named ZZKKO, was founded in China in 2008 by entrepreneur and search engine optimization (SEO) marketing specialist Chris Xu (Xu Yangtian).

Information on Xu's educational and career background remains elusive as of 2022, with sources conflicting on details of his biography. According to The Guardian, some sources have described him as a Chinese-American who graduated from George Washington University (GWU). However, other sources indicate that Xu was born in 1984 in Shandong province, and was educated at Qingdao University of Science and Technology. The Guardian notes that Xu is depicted in Chinese media coverage as an average student of poor origins. Shein has insisted that Xu was born in China.

The website SheInside.com was registered in March 2011, advertising itself as "a worldwide leading wedding dress company", although it sold general womenswear as well. The company acquired its items from Guangzhou's wholesale clothing market, which is a central hub to many of the company's garment manufacturers and markets.

At the time, Shein had no involvement in the design or production of the garments; it functioned similarly to a drop shipping firm, which sells items from third-party wholesalers directly to international customers.

2012—2019: Rebranding and integrated retailer status 
Shein made their products available in Spain, France, Russia, Italy, and Germany in the early 2010s; as well as selling cosmetics, shoes, purses, and jewelry, in addition to women's clothing. In 2012, the company established the current website and began using social media marketing by collaborating with fashion bloggers for giveaways and advertising items on Facebook, Instagram, and Pinterest.

In 2014, Shein acquired Romwe, a Chinese e-commerce retailer, making it a "fully integrated retailer." By 2016 the company had 100 employees and had already established its headquarters in Guangzhou, China. The firm's name changed again in 2015 from Sheinside to Shein, claiming that it needed a name that was simpler to remember and easy to find online.

By 2016, Xu gathered a team of 800 designers and prototype makers that manufactured Shein-branded clothing. The company began improving its supply chain, excluding vendors that provided low-quality items or photos.

By 2019, its merchandise was featured on daytime television shows in the United States with other internet businesses such as Fashion Nova and Zaful. Meanwhile, fashion influencers also displayed Shein products in haul videos alongside other well-known retailers. Despite being an online retail store, Shein also opened up pop-up shops for people who do not wish to purchase online.

Registration in Singapore 
In 2019, Singapore-registered Roadget Business Pte listed Chris Xu and others as representatives. By 2021, Chinese corporate filing shows that Shein de-registered its main business, Nanjing Top Plus Information Technology Co Ltd. Singapore filings reportedly shows Roadget as the legal entity operating Shein's global website and owns Shein's trademarks.

2020—present: Pandemic growth and rise to prominence 
Amid the COVID-19 pandemic in 2020, it reportedly made $10 billion in revenue, making it the seventh straight year of more than 100% sales growth for the company. , Shein was the world's largest online-only fashion firm. Shein was noted for being an early adopter of TikTok as a promotional tool, and the firm's ability to advertise viral items boosted Shein's popularity.

By November 2021, Shein grew from a company valued at $15 billion to one valued at $30 billion. , it is the largest fast fashion firm in the world. In October 2022, The Wall Street Journal reported that Shein generated US$24 billion in revenue in 2022, making it almost as large as Zara and H&M.

A survey of 7000 American teenagers in 2022 ranked Shein as their second favorite e-commerce website. In April 2022, Shein raised $1 billion to $2 billion in private funding and claimed 28% of the US fast fashion market.

In a May 2022 article in Fortune, the company was described as catering to Generation Z consumers while using big data and rapid Chinese manufacturing to quickly design clothing at a lower price point. The company was valued at $100 billion.

Expansion in North America and potential NYSE debut 
In 2022, Shein established a distribution center in Whitestown, Indiana and plans to open more distribution facilities in southern California and northeast US. In November 2022, Shein opened a new corporate office and distribution center in Markham, Ontario, which will function as Shein's main distribution hub in the Canada.

In 2023, The Information reported that Shein representatives had informal discussions with U.S.-based tech giants Amazon and Google about a potential investment in the company. The report notes that the company is expected to debut on the New York Stock Exchange (NYSE) in the future.

Marketing 
According to CNN, TikTok plays a large role in driving customers to the company website due to a TikTok trend of bulk buying clothes from Shein and presenting Shein clothes to their audience like a standard haul video. On May 17, 2021, the number of Shein's app downloads surpassed those of Amazon.

Shein claims to utilize the psychology of the new generation and implements marketing strategies accordingly to achieve growth. In 2020, Shein was the most talked about brand on TikTok and YouTube, and the 4th most talked-about brand on Instagram. Its low prices attract teenage internet shoppers with small budgets to post what they bought on social media.

For user growth, the company offers relatively low prices to stimulate demand. With more spending, customers can be rewarded with more discounts, which are encouraged to be applied to their next shopping trip. Shein not only makes use of its algorithm-driven recommendation system but also attracts customers to visit the platform frequently to do tasks, like adding items to their cart, watching live streams, and joining its contest show, to win points which can be redeemed later.

Manufacturing 
Originally, Shein did not design its clothes. The company mainly sourced its clothing from China's wholesale clothing market in Guangzhou. However, Shein became a fully integrated retailer in 2014 when it secured its supply chain system. Now, the company utilizes a network of manufacturing partners and suppliers to make and deliver its products.

Shein makes predictions on trends and produces items as quickly as three days after the identification of a trend. Shein also limits its orders to small batches of about 100 items to gauge customer interest, while its other competitors, like Zara, order larger quantities (about 500), increasing their chances of losing profit if orders are not purchased in full. According to Bloomberg News, Shein's small-batch strategy is seen as key to its success. Suppliers working with Shein also saw their business grow as the scale increased.

Tax treatment 
Shein can avoid paying export and import taxes, contributing to larger margins. The U.S. legislative bill Section 321 in the Trade Facilitation and Trade Enforcement Act of 2015 (also referred to as "de minimis") states that any import up to $800 per person is duty-free. This bill has allowed Shein to deliver to the USA without paying taxes, allowing Shein to have a competitive advantage over domestic companies in the USA.

Tax evasion accusations
The United Kingdom requires foreign sellers shipping low-value consignments (under £135) to register for UK VAT, collect VAT from buyers on such shipments, and remit it to His Majesty's Revenue and Customs. It has been suggested that Shein failed to do so for at least 9 months after the requirement took effect, and its website does not display its UK corporate registration number or itemize VAT, as UK rules require.

Controversies

Environmental and health issues 
Deutsche Welle released in late 2021 a video detailing the ultra-fast-fashion system Shein is built on, criticizing the targeting of young adolescents less susceptible to make wise financial decisions, as well as the caused environmental impact. Other media outlets have pointed at the addictive nature of the app, noting how its low prices get people to buy things they do not need. Due to the affordability of Shein, most clothes are not high-quality and can lead people to dispose of them, exacerbating the textile waste problem.

In response to criticism, Shein launched a resale service on its US app that enables the buying and selling of secondhand Shein fashion. There are mixed reactions to the efficacy of this initiative. Shein pieces are highly affordable hence customers may choose to buy a new item rather than purchase a resale piece.

Lead toxicity concerns 
Shein has also cited in a Marketplace investigation overseen by professor Miriam Diamond at the University of Toronto for selling toddlers' jackets that contained almost 20 times the amount of lead permitted under Health Canada's safety regulations. The company also sold a red purse that contained 5 times the permitted amount of lead. Shein notified Marketplace that they would stop selling the two items and would stop getting supplies from the corresponding suppliers until the problem was addressed.

Human rights and labor violations 
Shein has been accused of violating the rights of Chinese workers. In 2021, a Public Eye investigation by found that staff across six sites in Guangzhou were working 75-hour weeks in breach of Chinese labor laws. Public Eye also discovered workshops with blocked corridors and stairways.

In August 2021, Shein claimed on its website that its factories were certified by the International Organization for Standardization (ISO) and SA8000. This was disputed and was considered to be a breach of the United Kingdom's 2015 Modern Slavery Act. According to Reuters, Shein was also in violation of a similar anti-slavery law in Australia.

The Wall Street Journal reports that Shein has an in-house team to monitor supply-chain partners. Independent agencies such as Intertek Group will also be engaged to conduct audits.

Xinjiang controversy 
In November 2022, Bloomberg News reported that Shein's apparel was made with cotton sourced from Xinjiang amid the Uyghur genocide. Following the report, a coalition of U.S. senators wrote to Shein to demand information about the potential use of forced labour in Xinjiang for cotton products.

Legal experts have noted that Shein may be able to avoid the repercussions of the Uyghur Forced Labor Prevention Act as a result through a favorable tax loophole. A 2022 article published in Fortune notes that most Shein parcels shipped to the U.S. are worth less than $800 (de minimis shipments), which means that import taxes are waived on them. According to attorney Manuel Levitt of Miller & Chevalier, the small size of these packages means it is unlikely that U.S. Customs and Border Protection (CBP) will "scrutinize these little under $800 shipments to the same extent as they would a cargo container full of goods heading to a brand store."

Intellectual property (IP) theft 
In 2018, the company was sued by Levi Strauss & Co. for copying a trademarked jean stitching. The case was settled out of court. In 2021, AirWair International Limited, who are known for the Dr. Martens boots, in a lawsuit accused Shein and its sister company, Romwe, of selling copies of their designs (and calling them "Martins") at a cheaper price while using photos of authentic Dr. Marten shoes to "entice customers," to which Shein responded with a blanket denial of AirWair International's claims.

In March 2021, Ralph Lauren filed a trademark infringement and unfair competition lawsuit against Shein parent company. In the complaint, Ralph Lauren said that Zoetop Business Co. selling clothing with a "confusingly similar" mark was an exploitation of their "goodwill and reputation of genuine Ralph Lauren products."

In 2022, Mexico's Secretariat of Culture challenged the use of Shein's use of traditional Mayan designs, prompting Shein to remove them from its website.

Design theft accusations by artists and retailers 
Shein has also been accused by dozens of artists and small fashion retailers of stealing designs. Reclamare PH and Sincerely RIA, both of which are small fashion brands, have a Shein has copied their designs. Shein has also been accused of copying designs of non-clothing such as enamel pins.

In 2018, Ilse Valfre, who owns the LA-based brand Valfré, was notified by her customers that Shein was selling "identical copies" to her products. Quinn Jones, who is the co-founder of Los Angeles-based Kikay, said that he found earring designs on Shein that were very similar to Kikay's earrings. In response to the controversy, Shein removed the products and pledged to drop the supplier that produced the copied item. Elexiay also claims that Shein stole the design of a pink and green hand-crocheted sweater, which costs $330, but was sold by Shein for $17.

To bring awareness to Shein's actions and to help support indie brands and artists, the hashtag "boycottShein" became popular on TikTok and Twitter in 2020. In 2021, Mariama Diallo, founder of and designer for Sincerely Ria, accused Shein of stealing her designs in a Tweet that included comparative images to demonstrate her point.

Data and privacy issues

2018 data breach controversy 
The company also experienced a data breach in 2018 that compromised the email addresses and encrypted passwords of 6.42 million users, leading security experts to denounce the retailer's "reactive cybersecurity strategies" and inability to adequately protect its customers' information. Later, it was established that the company lied about the number of compromised accounts and that it was 39 million users that had not only their passwords and usernames stolen but also the information about their credit cards. Shein's parent company, Zoetop, was fined $1.9m in 2022 for its inadequate response to the data breach and for trying to minimize the severity of the breach.

App prohibition in India 
In June 2020, the Shein app was banned in India due to privacy concerns. The Ministry of Electronics and Information Technology of India classified the Shein app along with 59 other Chinese apps under Section 69A in The Information Technology Act, 2000, saying "[u]pon receiving recent credible inputs that such apps pose threat to sovereignty and integrity of India, the Government of India has decided to disallow the usage [...] both [on] mobile and non-mobile Internet-enabled devices." Section 69A grants the central government the "power to issue directions for blocking public access of any information through any computer resource". However, it is still legal in India to purchase Shein products on other websites that are not covered under Section 69A.

Criticism for offensive images 
In July 2020, a necklace with a swastika was reported and later removed from the site in response to widespread public criticism (the brand clarified that it was a Buddhist religious symbol, not a Nazi swastika). In May 2021, Shein received criticism for offering a phone case with an image of a handcuffed Black man outlined in chalk. Shein issued an apology for the offensive image, and also for using the image without the permission of the person who created the design.

References

External links 
 

2020s fashion
Clothing brands of China
Clothing retailers of China
Companies based in Nanjing
Internet properties established in 2008
Multinational companies headquartered in China
Retail companies established in 2008
Internet censorship in India